A general election was held in the Northern Territory, Australia, on 18 June 2005. The centre-left Labor Party, led by Chief Minister Clare Martin, won a second term with a landslide victory, winning six of the ten seats held by the opposition Country Liberal Party in the 25-member Northern Territory Legislative Assembly, bringing their total to 19. It was the second largest victory in any Northern Territory election.  The only larger majority in the history of the Territory was in the first election, in 1974.  In that contest, the CLP won 17 of the 19 seats in the chamber, and faced only two independents as opposition.

The most notable casualty was Opposition Leader Denis Burke's loss of his own seat of Brennan.  It was only the second time a party leader in the Territory had been defeated in his own electorate, after Majority Leader Goff Letts losing his seat of Victoria River in 1977.

Overall result

|}

The Labor Party won 52.5% of the primary vote, which was an increase of 11.9% over the 2001 election. The opposition Country Liberal Party polled 35.3%, a drop of 10.1% from 2001. The two party preferred result was Labor on 59.1% to the CLP on 40.9%, a swing to Labor of 11.1% from the previous election. It was the first time that Labor had won a majority of the two-party vote at a Territory election; the CLP had won a narrow majority of the two-party vote four years earlier. The Northern Territory Greens ran an increased number of candidates, and managed to increase their vote through much of Darwin, but had very little effect on the outcome of the election.

Labor won 19 seats against the CLP's four seats. Two independent members, Loraine Braham and Gerry Wood, were also re-elected.  While Labor had been favoured to win a second term, most commentators had predicted a gain of one or two seats at best. The size of the Labor landslide took even the most optimistic Labor observers by surprise.  Labor took six seats off the CLP.  Five of them – Brennan, Daly, Drysdale, Goyder and Port Darwin – were formerly safely conservative seats that Labor had never won before in the history of the Assembly. The ALP also retrieved the seat of MacDonnell, which had been a comfortably safe Labor seat until its shock fall to the CLP in 1997. The CLP also very narrowly failed to win back the formerly safe seat of Braitling from independent Loraine Braham, despite a strong challenge from CLP candidate Michael Jones.

Amidst what was their worst ever result, the CLP did have some good news in two seats which the ALP had been openly hoping to win. The ALP had run Fran Kilgariff, the very high-profile Mayor of Alice Springs and daughter of CLP founder Bernie Kilgariff as their candidate in Greatorex, against CLP Deputy Leader Dr Richard Lim. Despite Kilgariff's profile and the massive swing against the CLP elsewhere in the Territory, Lim managed to very narrowly retain his seat. There was a swing to the CLP in only one seat – Araluen, where leadership aspirant Jodeen Carney comfortably retained what had been the most marginal CLP-held seat.

The severity of the landslide result was all the more surprising considering that the ALP had never before been in government until 2001. The Legislative Assembly had been created in 1974, and the CLP had held government for an unbroken stretch of 27 years before Clare Martin won the ALP's first victory in 2001. The victory was seen in many cases not only as an endorsement of Martin's leadership, but also an endorsement of Labor's ability to govern.   The CLP had consistently alleged that the ALP was unfit to govern the Territory, and had used this as a key tactic during election campaigns many times in the past. However, it was also seen as being a vote of no-confidence in the opposition, and in the days after the election result, conservative Prime Minister John Howard strongly criticised the CLP for what he saw as their poor performance in opposition. Furthermore, the reduction of the CLP to just four seats raised questions as to whether it was viable for them to continue to be separate from the Liberal-National Coalition, which operates at federal level and in every other state and territory.

There were several prominent casualties of the election, but none was more significant or surprising than the defeat of Opposition Leader Denis Burke in the Palmerston-area seat of Brennan. Brennan was the CLP's safest seat anywhere in the Territory, with a CLP majority of 19 percent.  The ALP had never come close to winning any seats in Palmerston before. There had been no suggestion from any major commentators or opinion polls that Burke was even remotely under threat, but he was swept aside on election day with a swing against him of more than 21%. The ALP candidate, James Burke, a virtually unknown labor lawyer, expressed shock at his own win, and became a party legend overnight. Denis Burke had already stated that he would resign as party leader if he lost the election, but the loss of his seat forced the party to find a new leader immediately. The four remaining CLP members unanimously replaced Burke with Shadow Attorney-General and Shadow Health Minister Jodeen Carney. Another shock result came in Daly in the remote northern portion of the Territory.  It had previously been a reasonably safe CLP seat; retiring member Tim Baldwin held it with a majority of 9.5 percent.  However, Labor challenger Rob Knight took the seat on an unheard-of swing of 24 percent, turning it into a safe Labor seat in one stroke.

While the loss of Burke was a major shock, the defeat of three other CLP sitting members, Sue Carter (Port Darwin) Stephen Dunham (Drysdale) and John Elferink (MacDonnell) also posed major problems for the party. Elferink had been the Leader of Opposition Business, Opposition Whip and Shadow Minister for Community Development, Housing, Local Government, Sport and Recreation, Regional Development, and Indigenous Affairs, Dunham had been the Shadow Minister for Transport and Infrastructure, Lands and Planning, Parks and Wildlife and Essential Services, and Carter had been the Shadow Minister for Family and Community Services, Environment and Heritage, Arts and Museums and Women's Policy. In the aftermath of their defeat, all of these portfolios had to be redistributed among the four remaining CLP members, Carney (Araluen), Dr Richard Lim (Greatorex) Fay Miller (Katherine) and Terry Mills (Blain). This has raised concerns from both sides of politics about the CLP's ability to mount any form of effective opposition in the new parliament.

The two independent members of the outgoing parliament, disendorsed former CLP minister Loraine Braham and former Litchfield Mayor Gerry Wood both managed to retain their seats. In the lead-up to the election, there had been some suggestion that Wood may have some difficulty retaining his seat, but Braham had been widely expected to win another term. The final result turned out to be the opposite; Wood cruised to victory with a massive 15 percent swing in his favour, whereas Braham very narrowly retained her seat in a result that was not known for several days after the election. The election was a disappointment for other independent candidates; Wood's successor as Litchfield Mayor, Mary Walshe, fell well short of expectations in Goyder, and Wadeye councillor Dale Seaniger failed to make much impact in Daly.

As in past elections, minor parties failed to make much impact at the 2005 election. While the Northern Territory Greens ran an increased number of candidates and increased their votes, none of their candidates, including leader Ilana Eldridge came close to winning a seat, and their preferences had comparatively little effect on the outcome of any seats, let alone the election. The Network Against Prohibition ran in several seats, but did noticeably poorly. The Australian Democrats ran candidates in only two seats, a significant decrease from 2001, and barely rated at all. The Socialist Alliance chose not to run any candidates for financial reasons, instead endorsing the Green and NAP candidates.

Issues
Law and order has always been a prominent issue in the Northern Territory, and the Country Liberal Party campaigned on this heavily during their 27-year unbroken stint in government. Perhaps in acknowledgment of this, the Labor Party is also attempting to present itself as being harsh on antisocial behaviour. Mandatory sentencing is an issue in the background; there is some dispute as to its popularity in the Territory, and it is likely that a CLP government would reintroduce the policy, whereas it will almost definitely remain abolished under an ALP government.

The campaign

While there had been a form of unofficial campaign going on for some months, due to the persistent rumors of a coming election, there had been comparatively little in the way of policy announcements or major developments. Both parties began trading accusations that the other was being overly influenced by "southerners", with the ALP noting that the CLP had hired controversial federal Liberal staffer Ian Hanke and taking advantage of Burke's statements that he had had assistance from the federal Liberals in drafting his economic policies. At the same time, the CLP has been trying to link Martin's fortunes to those of less popular federal Labor leader Kim Beazley, and has suggested that she is being overly influenced by the federal party. (Where the CLP exists only in the Northern Territory, but is allied with the federal Liberals, the ALP is an entirely federal party.)

The CLP has also suffered due to a damaging row between Burke and former Shadow Minister Peter Maley, culminating in Maley's expulsion from the party on 19 May 2005. While Maley had once been touted as a potential leadership contender, he was later dumped from the ministry, and soon after announced his intention to retire at the 2005 election. Maley had reportedly not told Burke of his decision to retire before telling the media, and combined with his earlier axing, this aggravated tensions between the two. When the story broke on that Maley's wife had taken out a court order against him over domestic violence issues (although this was quickly withdrawn), Burke abruptly expelled Maley from the party. Maley served out the last weeks of his term as an independent, and briefly threatened to run for re-election, before deciding to publicly endorse the ALP candidate in his seat.

With the official announcement of the election on 30 May, the campaign began in earnest. Both parties made their first major policy launch on 1 June, with the ALP announcing plans to introduce laws cracking down on habitual drunks involved in antisocial behaviour, forcing them to undergo treatment or face jail, with a special alcohol court planned to deal with these offences. In contrast, the CLP concentrated on the economy, launching its "Territory 2020" plan to encourage business growth in the Territory, which amongst other things, would involve setting up a fund to encourage innovation and providing assistance to the armoured vehicle maintenance industry (Due to its location, Darwin, the Territory's capital, is a major defence hub, and defence industries are particularly important to the city's economy).

Retiring Members

Labor
 Jack Ah Kit MLA (Arnhem)

CLP
 Tim Baldwin MLA (Daly)

Independent
 Peter Maley MLA (Goyder) – elected as CLP

Candidates

Sitting members are listed in bold. Successful candidates are highlighted in the relevant colour.

Unregistered parties and groups
Two parties that did not hold registration with the Northern Territory Electoral Commission at the time of the election nevertheless endorsed candidates.
The Australian Democrats endorsed Janeen Bulsey in Barkly and Duncan Dean in Blain.
The Network Against Prohibition endorsed Scott White in Casuarina, Fiona Clarke in Fannie Bay, Gary Meyerhoff in Johnston, Rob Inder-Smith in Millner, and Stuart Highway in Nightcliff.

Seats changing hands 

 Members listed in italics did not contest their seats at this election.

Party leaders

 Clare Martin has been an MLA since 1995, leader of the Northern Territory ALP since 1997, and Chief Minister since 2001. A former journalist, she had overseen the ALP's first election victory in the history of the Territory in 2001. Martin had gained a reputation for being an effective communicator and economic manager, having also served a stint as treasurer. She campaigned largely on issues of law and order, and took some flak from her own party faithful for her policies, but would likely feel vindicated by the election result.
 Denis Burke had been an MLA since 1994 and had served as Chief Minister from 1999 to 2001. He had continued as Opposition Leader after being defeated by Martin, but was dumped in favour of Terry Mills in mid-2003, only to regain the leadership in February 2005 after Mills' sudden resignation. The former army officer is a strong social conservative, but had specifically emphasised law and order issues throughout his career, culminating in his controversial maintenance of the CLP's mandatory detention policy during his time as Chief Minister. His campaign was marred by several gaffes and a bold plan to solve the territory's electricity problems which was badly sold to the electorate and was not well received. He had already stated his intention to step down if the CLP lost the election before ultimately losing his own seat.
 Ilana Eldridge has been the leader of the Northern Territory Greens since their formation in the early 1990s. She has never held elected office, but has developed some profile from unsuccessful campaigns for the Senate in 1990 and 1996 and the Australian House of Representatives in 1998 and 2004. While again failing to win the seat of Nightcliff, she oversaw the only major third party campaign in the election, with the Greens substantially increasing both their number of candidates and their overall vote.

Electoral pendulum
The following pendulum is known as the Mackerras pendulum, invented by psephologist Malcolm Mackerras.  The pendulum works by lining up all of the seats held in the Legislative Assembly according to the percentage point margin they are held by on a two-party-preferred basis. This is also known as the swing required for the seat to change hands. Given a uniform swing to the opposition or government parties, the number of seats that change hands can be predicted.

Pre-election pendulum
Incumbent members who have become and remained an independent since the 2012 election are indicated in grey.

Members listed in italics did not re-contest their seat at the election.

Post-election pendulum

References

External links

Electoral sites
ABC's coverage of the Northern Territory election
Antony Green's election summary
The Mackerras Pendulum (PDF document)
Northern Territory Electoral Commission website
Complete list of candidates in the election

Party sites
Australian Labor Party (NT) website
Country Liberal Party website
Northern Territory Greens website
Network Against Prohibition website
Australian Democrats (NT) website

Elections in the Northern Territory
2005 elections in Australia
2000s in the Northern Territory
June 2005 events in Australia